In enzymology, a 10-deacetylbaccatin III 10-O-acetyltransferase is an enzyme that catalyzes the chemical reaction

acetyl-CoA + 10-deacetylbaccatin III  CoA + baccatin III

Thus, the two substrates of this enzyme are acetyl-CoA and 10-deacetylbaccatin III, whereas its two products are CoA and baccatin III.

This enzyme belongs to the family of transferases, specifically those acyltransferases transferring groups other than aminoacyl groups.  The systematic name of this enzyme class is acetyl-CoA:taxan-10beta-ol O-acetyltransferase. This enzyme participates in diterpenoid biosynthesis.

References

 

EC 2.3.1
Enzymes of unknown structure